The First Evangelical Lutheran Church is a historic church building at 1115 North D Street in Fort Smith, Arkansas.  It is a large limestone structure, built in a cruciform plan with a pair of towers flanking its main facade.  It was built in 1901–04 to a design by William Hornor Blakely, a prominent local architect.  The congregation for which it was built was formally established in 1852 by German immigrants to the area.  Its first church, completed in 1869, stood nearby, and was converted to educational use by the congregation.

The building was listed on the National Register of Historic Places in 2017.

See also
National Register of Historic Places listings in Sebastian County, Arkansas

References

Churches on the National Register of Historic Places in Arkansas
Gothic Revival church buildings in Arkansas
Churches completed in 1904
Churches in Sebastian County, Arkansas
Buildings and structures in Fort Smith, Arkansas
National Register of Historic Places in Sebastian County, Arkansas
1904 establishments in Arkansas
Lutheran churches in Arkansas